William G. Evans (born September 2, 1956) is an American musician, author, and instructor noted for his banjo proficiency and knowledge of the history of the instrument.

Biography
Evans earned a master's degree in Music from University of California, Berkeley in 1992, with a focus on ethnomusicology. He learned banjo in person from masters such as Tony Trischka, Alan Munde, Bill Keith, Ben Eldridge, Sonny Osborne, and J. D. Crowe.

Cloud Valley
Evans' first band was Charlottesville, Virginia-based Cloud Valley with Missy Raines (bass), Charlie Rancke (guitar), and Steve Smith (mandolin).  The progressive bluegrass band released two albums: A Bluegrass Ensemble in 1983 and Live In Europe in 1985. Their final performance was in Winfield, Kansas in 1985, but Evans still collaborates with individual band members.

Dry Branch Fire Squad
For some time, Evans performed and recorded with Dry Branch Fire Squad.

Bluegrass Intentions
Evans was a member of the bluegrass ensemble Bluegrass Intentions with Suzy Thompson (fiddle, Cajun accordion, vocals), Eric Thompson (mandolin, guitar, vocals), Larry Cohea (bass, vocals),  and Alan Senauke (guitar, vocals). They released one album Old as Dirt on Evans's Native and Fine record label in 2002.

Due West
Bluegrass group Due West featured Evans, Jim Nunally (guitar), Erik Thomas (mandolin), and Chad Manning (fiddle). Their one album is These Boots released in 2003.

Bill Evans String Summit
The Bill Evans String Summit is Evans, Scott Nygaard (guitar), Michael Witcher (dobro), Cindy Browne (bass), Tashina Clarridge (violin), and Tristan Clarridge (violin, cello). Group members bring together their influences from their backgrounds in jazz, classical, and world music.

Recent collaborations
Evans has been touring and holding workshops several weeks each year with Alan Munde (Country Gazette). He has also been recording with long-time bluegrass fiddler Fletcher Bright. Evans tours frequently with mandolin player Steve Smith from Cloud County, and with fiddler Megan Lynch. He also has been touring with Dan Crary (guitar) and Steve Spurgin (bass).

Education and teaching
Evans has taught ethnomusicology at San Francisco State University, the University of Virginia, and Duke University. Evans gives private banjo lessons at his home in Albany, California. He also stages banjo workshops at major music festivals all over the country.

A convocation by Evans "The Banjo in America: A Musical and Cultural History" has been presented in various venues across the country. This convocation traces the history of the banjo from West African to the New World, with performances on vintage instruments of music from the 1700s to today.

Music Instruction Author
In 2007, Wiley Publishing published the book Banjo for Dummies authored by Evans. This was followed in 2016 in by Bluegrass Banjo for Dummies.

In recent years, Evans has been the author of the "Off the Record" instructional column for Banjo Newsletter magazine.

Evans and Dix Bruce co-authored the Parking Lot Pickers Songbook published by Mel Bay Publications.

Endorsements
American Made Banjo Company created the Bill Evans Signature Series 5 String Kel Kroydon banjo.

Awards
Bill Evans was awarded the 2022 Steve Martin Banjo Prize 11/10/2022.   

In 1997, Evans was awarded a musical composition fellowship by the Kentucky Arts Council.

In 1996, Evan's album Native and Fine earned an honorable mention in the category of Acoustic Instrumental Recording of the Year from the NAIRD (National Association of Independent Record Retailers and Distributors).

The album "Bill Evans Plays Banjo" was cited by the Chicago Tribune as a Top 10 Bluegrass Recording of 2001.

Discography

Solo albums
 1995: Native and Fine (Rounder)
 2001: Plays Banjo (Mighty Fine)
 2009: ...Let's Do Something... (Native and Fine) with Megan Lynch
 2012: In Good Company (Native and Fine)
 2013: Fine Times at Fletcher's House (Native and Fine) with Fletcher Bright
 2016: Songs That Are Mostly Older Than Us (Native and Fine) with Fletcher Bright, Norman Blake, and Nancy Blake

As a member of Cloud Valley
 1982: A Bluegrass Ensemble (Outlet)
 1985: Live In Europe (Strictly Country)

As a member of Dry Branch Fire Squad
 1996: Live! At Last (Rounder)

As a member of Bluegrass Intentions
 2002: Old As Dirt (Native and Fine)

As a member of Due West
 2003: These Boots (Native and Fine)

As producer
 1998: Suzanne Thomas - Dear Friends & Gentle Hearts (Rounder)

Also appears on
 1983: Alan Munde - In the Tradition (Ridge Runner) - banjo on track 3, "Five by Two"
 1999: Buckeye - Buckeye (B Music)
 2000: Enzo Garcia - Words (Recaredo)
 2001: Kathy Kallick - My Mother's Voice (Copper Creek)
 2004: Chad Manning - Old Gnarly Oak (Tricopolis)
 2007: Jim Nunally - Gloria's Waltz (FGM)
 2008: Los Cenzontles - Los Senn-Sont-Less (self-released)
 2008: Tony Trischka - Territory (Smithsonian Folkways)
 2010: Steve Smith, Chris Sanders, and Hard Road - Signs Along the Road (self-released)
 2012: Mike McKinley - Bindlestiff (Sand Rabbit)
 2012: Bill Emerson and the Sweet Dixie Band - The Touch of Time (Rural Rhythm)
 2012: Jody Stecher - Wonders & Signs (Vegetiboy)

Music Instruction

DVDs
 2003: Power Pickin' Vol. 1: Up the Neck Backup for Bluegrass Banjo (AccuTab)
 2005: The Bluegrass Banjo of Sonny Osborne (Accutab) hosted by Bill Evans and Tom Adler
 2010: Power Pickin' Vol. 3: Playing Banjo Backup in a Bluegrass Band (AccuTab)
 2010: Power Pickin' Vol. 4: Power Pickin Vol. 4: Bluegrass Banjo Master Claas (AccuTab)
 2012: Harmony Singing Made Easy DVD (Murphy Method) with Janet Beazley, Chris Stuart, and Murphy Henry
 2013: Bluegrass Banjo Favorites (Homespun)
 2016: Bluegrass Banjo Licks-ercises Vol 1: Scruggs Style (Homespun)
 2016: Bluegrass Banjo Licks-ercises Vol 2: Single String and Melodic Styles (Homespun)

Books
 2006: Absolute Beginners: Banjo (Music Sales America) 
 2007: Banjo for Dummies (Wiley) 
 2007: Parking Lot Picker's Songbook: Banjo (Mel Bay) with Dix Bruce 
 2015: Bluegrass Banjo For Dummies (Wiley)

References

External links
 
 
 

1956 births
Living people
Bluegrass musicians from Virginia
American country banjoists
Country musicians from Virginia